opened in Urasoe, Okinawa Prefecture, Japan, in January 2004. The main auditorium seats 632 and there is also a smaller hall with a capacity of 255. In addition to performances of Kumi Odori and Ryūkyūan music and dance, there are initiatives to document, preserve, and promote Okinawa's performing arts (in particular, Kumi Odori), as well as related exchange programmes across the Asia-Pacific region.

See also

 List of Intangible Cultural Properties of Japan (Okinawa)
 National Theatre of Japan
 Ryūkyū Kingdom
 Eisa (dance)
 Buyō

References

External links
  National Theatre Okinawa
  National Theatre Okinawa (Japan Arts Council)

Arts centres in Japan
Culture in Okinawa Prefecture